Cristian Damián Villanueva (born 25 December 1983) is a retired Argentine professional footballer who played as a defender.

Career
Villanueva began his career in 2001 with Deportivo Roca. He remained with the club for seven years in Torneo Argentino B, scoring three times in ninety-two matches between the 2001–02 and 2007–08 seasons. In July 2008, Villanueva joined Primera B Nacional side Olimpo. He made his professional debut against Aldosivi on 16 August, before scoring his first goal on 4 October versus Tiro Federal. In his first two seasons, he made fifty-three appearances as Olimpo won promotion to the Argentine Primera División in 2009–10. He netted his first top-flight goal in December 2010 v. Newell's Old Boys. He left in 2018, after ten years with Olimpo.

Villanueva subsequently signed for Sansinena of Torneo Federal A.

Career statistics
.

Honours
Olimpo
Primera B Nacional: 2009–10

References

External links

1983 births
Living people
People from General Roca
Argentine footballers
Association football defenders
Torneo Argentino B players
Primera Nacional players
Argentine Primera División players
Torneo Federal A players
Deportivo Roca players
Olimpo footballers
Club Atlético Sansinena Social y Deportivo players